The 1944 United States presidential election in Missouri took place on November 7, 1944, as part of the 1944 United States presidential election. Voters chose 15 representatives, or electors, to the Electoral College, who voted for president and vice president.

Missouri was won by incumbent President Franklin D. Roosevelt (D–New York), running with Senator Harry S. Truman, with 51.37% of the popular vote, against Governor Thomas E. Dewey (R–New York), running with Governor John Bricker, with 48.43% of the popular vote.

Results

Results by county

See also
 United States presidential elections in Missouri

References

Missouri
1944
1944 Missouri elections